The Tibet national football team is a football team that represents the cultural region of Tibet in non-FIFA international tournaments, and is organised by the Tibetan National Football Association (TNFA), an organisation of exiled Tibetans. 

Many of the players are in exile and are represented by the Tibetan Government in Exile. The team is part of neither FIFA nor the AFC and does not participate in international tournaments. The TNFA was founded in 2001 and its goal is to gain an official status.

History

The Forbidden Team

The first international game against a non-Asian team was versus Greenland, which took place in Denmark. The team was followed by a documentary film crew during the process of forming the team, practicing, playing the match, and events in between. The documentary was titled 'The Forbidden Team'. To form the team, a selective tournament was held in Dehradun, India, featuring all the various Tibetan football teams around India.

After the team was selected, Team Tibet headed to Dharamsala to begin practice sessions. Jens Espense was hired by the Tibetan Football Association to coach the team for the match. He had only a month to get the players conditioned and ready to play, despite the team not yet playing at even a minor league level. Moreover, the pitch was in poor condition and only half of it could be used, as it was located on a public road. During practice, Karma Nyodup was working to complete all documentation  for the flight to Greenland. A number of players were subsequently dropped due to improper travel documents.

After a month, the team flew to Denmark for its first international game, which was organised by Michael Nybrandt. He was also advocating Tibet at a time when the Chinese government officials had made it clear that they did not want this match to happen as they believed Tibet belonged to China.  They threatened to cut off all of China's trade with Denmark if the match went ahead as planned.  Denmark however, did not back down and allowed the game to take place.  On 30 June 2001 the Tibetan National Football Team played its first international match where it lost 1– 4 against Greenland.

FIFI Wild Cup (Hamburg, Germany) and ELF Cup (Northern Cyprus)
The 2006 FIFI Wild Cup took place in Hamburg, Germany.  The first match they played was against St. Pauli on 30 May 2006.  They lost this game 7–0.  The second and final match of Tibet in this tournament was against Gibraltar on 31 May 2006.  They lost this game 5–0.   During the ELF Cup Tibet did not win any games.  The first game was against Tajikistan on 19 November 2006 where they lost 3–0.  On 20 November, Tibet played the Crimean Tatars, which they lost 1–0.  Finally, on 21 November the biggest loss came when Tibet played Northern Cyprus, who beat them 10–0.

International Tournament of Peoples, Cultures and Tribes 
From 22 to 29 June 2013, Tibet was invited to Marseille in France to participate in the first edition of the International Tournament of Peoples, Cultures and Tribes.

The Tibetan team finished the competition in fifth place.

2018 ConIFA World Football Cup 
For the first time in its history, the Tibetan selection participated in the ConIFA World Football Cup in 2018 by qualifying with the wild card.

Current squad
The following players were called up to the squad for the 2018 ConIFA World Football Cup in London.

Head Coach:  Penpa Tsering

Selected internationals

General Secretaries of the TNFA

Honours
ANFA Cup
Runners-up (1): 1985

References

External links 
  (TNFA)
  (ConIFA) 

 
Sport in Tibet
CONIFA member associations
Asian national and official selection-teams not affiliated to FIFA
Football in Tibet
Football in China